Life Cycle is an album by American jazz drummer Whit Dickey recorded in 2000 and released on the Aum Fidelity label. Dickey leads the Nommonsemble, which includes Rob Brown on alto sax and flute, Mat Maneri on viola and Matthew Shipp on piano.

Reception 

In his review for AllMusic, Sam Samuelson states "The Nommonsemble pull together a concise and pleasing recording that for the most part proves itself to be relevant and thought-provoking."

The Penguin Guide to Jazz notes that "They're a highly compatible quartet, four thinkers who prefer the dryer end of free jazz and, while the record isn't exactly exciting, it certainly makes its own space."

The JazzTimes review by Aaron Steinberg says "Though obdurate and knotty on the whole, Life Cycle maintains a calm and spacious core throughout, which is due largely to Dickey's drumming and his sensitive interaction with Shipp."

Track listing 

All compositions by Whit Dickey
 "Wonder" – 5:32
 "War" – 7:04 
 "Games" – 4:50
 "Love" – 7:02
 "Acceptance" – 7:55
 "Transformation" – 9:21

Personnel 

Whit Dickey – drums
Rob Brown – alto sax, flute
Mat Maneri – viola
Matthew Shipp – piano

References 

2001 albums
Whit Dickey albums
AUM Fidelity albums